Thrisha Luise Canete, (born October 6, 2004) commonly known as Cha-Cha Cañete or Bulilit, is a Filipina actress and singer. She was first discovered by talent manager Erik Matti upon noticing her inside a coffee shop at the ABS-CBN compound when she was four years old, and started out as a commercial model for the real estate company Camella Homes, with a song "Bulilit Sanay Sa Masikip".

She appears regularly on the reruns of the children's sketch comedy show Goin' Bulilit.

She performed Girl on Fire by Alicia Keys in 
Tawag ng Tanghalan: Celebrity Champions on October 19, 2019.

Filmography

Film

Television

Music

Accolades

Awards and nominations

References

External links

2004 births
Living people
Filipino child actresses
Star Magic
21st-century Filipino actresses
21st-century Filipino women singers
ABS-CBN personalities